The single locomotive designated JŽ 341 is a curiosity.

It was originally designed for hauling freight and passenger-trains on the then new mountain part of the electrified Rijeka mainline. When it was found out, that the axle load was high, further orders were cancelled. The maintenance and usage of this locomotive caused troubles in that there was only one unit of this type. The production and holding of spare parts was uneconomic.

The final years of this locomotive were used in banking freight traffic over the very hilly and difficult Rijeka-Zagreb line between Fužine and Lokve.

The locomotive was retired sometime around 1986.

Photographs of this locomotive are very rare.

External links 
 341 at railfaneurope.net

Electric locomotives of Croatia